The Doughball Point Formation is an early Ediacaran volcanic formation cropping out in Newfoundland.

References

Ediacaran Newfoundland and Labrador